Josiah Leavitt (1744–1804) was an early Massachusetts physician and inventor. Possessed of an early love for mechanical movements and for music, Dr. Leavitt eventually gave up his medical practice and moved to Boston, where he became one of the earliest manufacturers of pipe organs in the United States.

Early life 

Josiah Leavitt was born October 21, 1744, in Hingham, Massachusetts, the son of Hezekiah and Grace (Hatch) Leavitt. Hezekiah Leavitt was a prosperous Hingham merchant who owned one of the town's largest warehouses on the harbor, a large wharf and a share of the town's gristmill and fisheries business. Josiah Leavitt's father was a close friend and business associate of Rev. Ebenezer Gay, third minister of Old Ship Church, Hingham's Meetinghouse.

Following his education at Harvard College, Dr. Josiah Leavitt became a practicing physician at Hingham. On the side, the mechanically-inclined Leavitt tinkered with inventions and mechanical movements. One of the first products of Leavitt's sideline was a large clock, manufactured in 1772–73, which was subsequently hung in a dormer window on the southwesterly slope of the roof of Old Ship Church, so that the clock's dial could be seen by townspeople. Leavitt's clock, the first built in Hingham, was probably the only clock he ever built. Where Dr. Leavitt garnered his expertise is unknown, although contemporaries noted his mechanical aptitude, as well as the fact that his sister Hannah was married to Hingham watchmaker Joseph Lovis.

In 1774, Dr. Leavitt built a large Colonial clapboard home  at 93 Main Street, two blocks from the Meetinghouse. But shortly afterwards, Leavitt moved to Sterling, Massachusetts, where he built another Colonial home, and then a few years later to Boston, where he gave up his medical practice, embraced his affinity for music and mechanics and began manufacturing organs.

Organ-making in the American Colonies 

The first organ in America had been manufactured earlier in the eighteenth century. Most American churches, especially Anglican, often purchased their organs from London builders. Boston's Trinity Church purchased an organ from London builder Abraham Jordan in 1744; by 1756 Boston's King's Chapel had replaced a primitive early organ with one by London manufacturer Richard Bridge, whose organ of 1733 was still in use at Trinity Church in Newport, Rhode Island. Boston's Brattle Street Church finally purchased an elaborate English organ in 1790 manufactured by Londoner Samuel Green. But the rise of native-born organ builders, as well as a backlash against English imports, began to stimulate a demand for American-born instruments.

In 1790, for instance, on the eve of the arrival of Brattle Square Church's London organ, the congregation went into an uproar. "So bitterly had this most liberal of Boston congregational churches been divided over the issue that even as the ship bearing the organ hove into view, a conservative member of the congregation offered to reimburse the church its cost if the instrument were thrown overboard outside Boston harbor."

As a consequence of the increasing prosperity in the former English colony, the relaxation of Puritanism's formal rigors (the church had an historic aversion to organs), a dislike of purchasing English products and the emergence of American organ builders, a small market began to develop in New England for homegrown organs. Previously, Boston's Park Street Church had a 50-voice choir – but no organ. And of the region's host of Congregationalist churches, only First Church in Providence, Rhode Island, dared used an organ in worship prior to the Revolutionary War. Most houses of worships made do with a pitch pipe, or with a cello or bass viol.

But following the Revolutionary War, demand for organs, previously limited to more progressive Anglican churches, began to take off. Edward Bromfield Jr. of Boston, Massachusetts is generally credited with having built America's first organ in 1745. (Indications are that a Philadelphia craftsman, Mathias Zimmerman actually built an earlier organ prior to 1737). Because of the limited demand, Blomfield built most of his organs for amateur (and not ecclesiastical) use.  Of all Boston's churches, by 1753 only one – Christ Church (Old North Church) – had an American-made organ, built by Thomas Johnston, a local craftsman, in 1753. A year later, Johnston built an organ for Salem's Christ Episcopal Church containing one manual and six stops. At the time, Bromfield and Johnston were the only active American organ builders.

Dr. Leavitt embarks on a new career 

Because of his musical interests, Dr. Leavitt had corresponded with organ builder Bromfield, and was also acquainted with craftsman Johnston, who died in 1768. Shortly afterwards,  Leavitt himself relocated to Boston. "Once a practicing physician", noted a report by the United States Centennial Commission in 1876, "[Dr. Leavitt's] strong taste for the mechanics of music induced him to relinquish his profession and devote himself to organ-building, which he continued for many years."

In Boston, the former physician set about creating a workshop where he and several assistants began building organs for New England churches. On February 8, 1792, an advertisement appeared in The Columbian Centinel announcing that Leavitt had finished an organ destined for the Universalist Religious Society of Boston. "For compass and sweetness of sound and elegance of construction", the newspaper noted, "it is exceeded by but a few imported Organs."

By the following November, Leavitt, who had entirely given up his medical practice in favor of producing organs, had completed a new instrument for the Congregationalist Meetinghouse in Worthington, Connecticut. He was soon building other organs to satisfy the burgeoning demand. The arrival of one of Leavitt's creation at the Worthington meeting house was an event of enough import that The Hartford Courant ran a story about it:

"The public are hereby notified", wrote The Courant, "that Mr. Josiah Leavitt of Boston, organ builder hath lately been employed to construct an ORGAN for the Worthington parish, which is completed and set up in the Meeting-house. The Organ will be opened by said Leavitt on Thursday the 8th of November instant, at which time a sermon will be preached on the occasion, and Music will be performed. After the exercises there will be a collection for the benefit of said builder."

Other churches, now freed from the old Puritan strictures against musical instrument accompaniment, were soon ordering Leavitt's organs. The church of Newburyport, Massachusetts, in 1794 set up Leavitt's creation in the gallery of the meeting house, and subsequently showed off its acquisition. "This organ (which is certainly the most elegant of any in New England", noted the town's newspaper the Morning Star, "is about fifteen feet high, ten feet in breadth, and seven feet from front to rear, was built by Dr. Josiah Leavitt, an ingenious organ builder of Boston, for whose benefit there will be a contribution after service is over."

Among other churches which ordered Leavitt organs were the Episcopal church of Dedham, Massachusetts, and TK. His business, though, was still spotty enough that he sometimes advertised his half-completed instruments for sale in regional newspapers. One 1793 ad in the Portsmouth, New Hampshire, Oracle of the Day noted that Leavitt had on hand "a Church-Organ nearly completed, (except the Case and Pipes)", which he would finish building to the buyer's specifications. Another instrument on hand in the former physician's workshop was "an elegant House-Organ with a Mahogany case, and which might be sufficient for a small Church or Society." Should the instrument prove inadequate, Leavitt's ad noted, he would take it back within one year in trade for a larger one.

Later life and legacy 

"It was a particular accomplishment that Josiah Leavitt, a Congregationalist, was able to place instruments in dissenting churches", writes Orpha Caroline Ochse in The History of the Organ in the United States. "Many of these churches were still violently opposed to the use of the organ, an attitude that some of them retained through much of the next century."

Leavitt also trained other later organ builders. Among his pupils were William M. Goodrich, a native of Templeton, Massachusetts, born in 1777. Goodrich himself became an active organ-builder in Boston beginning in 1803. It was Goodrich whom many consider the first advanced American organ manufacturer. In addition to sending out his elegant creations to churches throughout the region, Goodrich trained a number of other makers, including Thomas Appleton, as well as his own brother Ebenezer Goodrich, who later went into business for himself.

Dr. Josiah Leavitt died at his Boston home on February 26, 1804. The golden age of American organ building was still ahead, as New England's increasing prosperity and growing know-how, fostered in part by the early physician turned manufacturer, gave rise to such accomplished organ builders as Hook & Hastings, and the ateliers of Erben, Jardine, and Roosevelt, many of which thrived in Boston and its vicinity, and whose trade was fueled in part by the profits of the large trading firms of Salem and the state capitol.

Dr. Josiah Leavitt, descended from an early Puritan early settler of Hingham, was buried at Hingham, Massachusetts. Leavitt's second wife Azubah  died at Boston in November 1803 at age 44. The Hingham meeting house Old Ship Church did not purchase an organ until 1869. Prior to that the congregants sang unaccompanied.

References

See also
John Leavitt 
List of pipe organ builders 
Old Ship Church 
E. and G.G. Hook Organ 
Pipe organs

1744 births
1804 deaths
Leavitt family
Harvard College alumni
American Congregationalists
People from Boston
18th-century American physicians
18th-century American inventors
American pipe organ builders
People of colonial Massachusetts
People from Hingham, Massachusetts
Inventors from Massachusetts